State Route 554 (SR 554) is an east–west state highway located in the southeastern corner of Ohio, a U.S. state. Its eastern terminus is at an intersection with State Route 7 in Cheshire, two blocks west of the Ohio River.

Route description
The entirety of State Route 554 is contained within Gallia County.  No portion of this state highway is included as a part of the National Highway System.

History
State Route 554 was designated in 1937 along the routing through Gallia County that it currently occupies.  No changes of major significance have taken place to this state highway since it was first certified.

Major intersections

References

554
Transportation in Gallia County, Ohio